TransMeridian Airlines was an Atlanta, Georgia based charter airline, operating under U.S. Department of Transportation Federal Aviation Regulations Part 121. It ceased all operations on September 29, 2005, after negotiations with creditors to restructure its debt failed.

History
The scheduled charter airline was founded in 1995. TransMeridian originally flew on behalf of the nation’s largest tour operators from the upper Midwest and Northeast to points in the Caribbean and Mexico, but later expanded to operate its own branded scheduled charter service with an additional focus on Florida destinations. At its peak, it had 7 Boeing 727s, 11 Airbus A320, 7 Boeing 757 and 7 MD-80 aircraft in service.

Over its ten-year history, TransMeridian safely carried well over one million passengers to over 150 destinations primarily within the United States, Mexico, South America and the Caribbean.

At the time of its closing, TransMeridian operated a domestic hub operation from Orlando Sanford International Airport (SFB) with service to Syracuse, NY, Rockford, IL, Allentown, PA, Harrisburg, PA, Toledo, OH, Belleville, IL, Louisville, KY, Cincinnati, OH and Las Vegas, NV. International TMA destinations included Liberia, Costa Rica; Aruba; Punta Cana and Puerto Plata, Dominican Republic; and San Juan and Aguadilla, Puerto Rico.

In 2004, Senator John Kerry used a chartered Boeing 757 from TransMeridian for his 2004 presidential campaign. 

The airline declared Chapter 7 bankruptcy on 29 September 2005 and ceased all operations.

See also 
 List of defunct airlines of the United States

Fleet

The TransMeridian Airlines fleet consisted of the following aircraft:

 13 Airbus A320-200
 7 Boeing 727-200
 7 Boeing 757-200
 5 McDonnell Douglas MD-82
 2 McDonnell Douglas MD-83

References

External links

Companies that have filed for Chapter 7 bankruptcy
Defunct airlines of the United States
Airlines established in 1995
History of Atlanta
Airlines disestablished in 2005